Pathavi Pramanam is a 1994 Indian Tamil-language political satire film directed by K. R. Udayasankar. The film stars Vijayakanth, Vineetha, Ramesh Aravind and Keerthana. It was released on 10 June 1994.

Plot 

The film begins with Siva escaping from jail, Siva is a convict who failed to kill the politician R. K. twice. At the transfer of power, R. K. will take oath as the new chief minister of Tamil Nadu, so he deploys heavy security to protect him from Siva. Before that, Siva manages to kidnap R. K. and hauled him to a television station. Siva tells his past to the audience and the reason behind the kidnapping.

Cast 

Vijayakanth as Siva
Vineetha as Krishnaveni
Ramesh Aravind as Selvamani (guest appearance)
Keerthana as Seetha Lakshmi
Rajan P. Dev as R. K. (Rajakumar)
Mohan Natarajan as Mahadevan
Vennira Aadai Moorthy
Kovai Sarala
Kumarimuthu
Chitti as Police inspector
Priya
Sempuli Jagan
R. N. K. Prasad as President of India
Mohan V. Ram as Governor of Tamil Nadu
Shari
Raviraj
King Kong
Rani in a special appearance

Soundtrack 

The music was composed by Deva, with lyrics written by Kamakodiyan and Piraisoodan.

Reception 
K. Vijiyan of New Straits Times labelled the film as "fast-paced political tale", and Malini Mannath of The Indian Express described the film as "a fairly engrossing entertainer despite its flaws". R. P. R. of Kalki noted down that the story is similar to old films of Vijayakanth and the dialogues reminds of television serials while calling climax as a good joke. He however found Mohan Natrajan as the only likeable character from the entire film and concluded that since director Udayashankar is a debutant from D. F. T., he's spared with sympathy. The film failed at the box office.

References

External links 
 

1990s masala films
1990s political satire films
1990s Tamil-language films
1994 films
Films scored by Deva (composer)
Indian political satire films